Aisha Jefferson (born October 27, 1986) is an American former professional basketball player. She played college basketball for Michigan State University.

College career
After earning all-Big Ten freshman recognition for the 2005–06 season and scoring 10.4 points per game as a sophomore, Jefferson was forced to miss the 2007–08 season to undergo surgery to repair a torn anterior cruciate ligament. She was an honorable mention All-Big Ten in 2006–07 and 2008–09 and ended her college career as 11th on the MSU all-time scoring list with 1,194 points.

Statistics
Source

References

External links
Aisha Jefferson bio
Profile at EuroBasket.com

1986 births
Living people
American women's basketball players
Michigan State Spartans women's basketball players
Basketball players from Dayton, Ohio
Forwards (basketball)
PAOK Women's Basketball players
21st-century American women